Daniela Schultze (born 3 November 1990) is a German rower. She competed in the women's eight event at the 2012 Summer Olympics.

She won the U23 women's double sculls World Championship in 2011 with Mareike Adams.  She was also part of the German quadruple sculls team that won the 2017 European Rowing Championships (with Charlotte Reinhardt, Frauke Hundeling and Frieda Hämmerling).

References

External links

1990 births
Living people
German female rowers
Olympic rowers of Germany
Rowers at the 2012 Summer Olympics
Rowers at the 2020 Summer Olympics
Sportspeople from Cottbus